Élise-Daucourt is a commune in the Marne department in north-eastern France. The commune consists of 2 villages, Élise and Daucourt, which are 1 mile apart. Both villages were separate communes until 1965, when they merged. Since the merger Élise is often called Élise-Daucourt. Both villages lie about 6 km south of Sainte-Menehould, the nearest regional town.

See also
Communes of the Marne department

References

External links

Elisedaucourt